Fabio Antonio Seixas Barros (born 11 April 1965) is a Brazilian former footballer who played as a forward.

Club career
Fabio Barros played for Gazélec Ajaccio between 1986 and 1990, amassing a total of eleven goals from eighty-four league appearances. While in Corsica, he introduced locals to beach soccer.

Personal life
Barros was friends with Carlos Kaiser, the Brazilian conman who became famous for having a football career without ever playing a game. When Barros returned to Brazil on holiday, Kaiser made copies of his Gazélec Ajaccio registration card, and the two took photos with Kaiser wearing a Gazélec Ajaccio jersey in a field in Horto, to make it seem as if he was also a player of the Corsican club.

Career statistics

Club

Notes

References

1965 births
Living people
Sportspeople from Amazonas (Brazilian state)
Brazilian footballers
Association football forwards
Ligue 2 players
Championnat National 2 players
Gazélec Ajaccio players
Brazilian expatriate footballers
Brazilian expatriate sportspeople in France
Expatriate footballers in France